Ntare IV Rutaganzwa Rugamba was the king of Burundi from 1796 to 1850. He was the son of king  Mwambutsa I Mbariza.

He achieved the greatest expansion in the history of Burundi, doubling the territory.

References 

Burundian kings
18th-century monarchs in Africa
19th-century monarchs in Africa